Owch Bolagh (also Romanized as Owch Bolāgh, Aūch Bulāq, and Ūch Bolāgh) is a village in Aq Bolagh Rural District, Sojas Rud District, Khodabandeh County, Zanjan Province, Iran. At the 2006 census, its population was 161, in 32 families.

References 

Populated places in Khodabandeh County